Suna Selen (born 1 July 1939) is a Turkish actress of theatre, film and television. She has appeared in numerous plays at the Istanbul State Theatre.

Life 
Selen was born in 1939 in Istanbul. Her father was lawyer Hüsamettin Selen, and her mother, Nimet Selen, was a granddaughter of scholar Ahmed Cevdet Pasha and daughter of Fatma Aliye Topuz.

She finished her high school education at the Beşiktaş Atatürk Anadolu Lisesi. During her high school years she also attended the Theatre Department of Beşiktaş Municipal Conservatory. In 1956, she started studying law at the request of her family. At the same time she started to work at the Dormen Theatre. A year later, she left the law school and started her painting education at the Istanbul Academy of Fine Arts. In 1957, she married the painter Cem Kabaağaç and together they had a son. After her marriage, she left the Academy and pitched out her role at the Dormen Theatre. She began her professional career in the theatre season of 1959–60 with Alexandro Casona's Woman Coming at Dawn. During the same season she soon became famous as Nicole Cerusier in Alber Husson's comedy The Pavements in the Sky.

In addition to theatre plays, she also starred in a number of motion pictures and series. For her role as the Witch in Pamuk Prenses ve 7 Cüceler she won the Best Supporting Actress award at the 1971 International Antalya Film Festival. She was the recipient of the Best Supporting Actress award at the Ankara International Film Festival for her role as Füruzan in Cazibe Hanımın Gündüz Düşleri. For her role as Elmas in Gönderilmemiş Mektuplar, Selen won the Best Actress award at the International Istanbul Film Festival.

Selen's second marriage was to Münir Özkul, from which she has a daughter, named Güner Özkul. In 1974, she divorced Münir Özkul and married play writer Güner Sümer. She later gave birth to her third child and second son Sinan Sümer.

In 2016, "because of the dignity she gained in acting profession during her long life as an artist", she became the first recipient of the Lifetime Nadide Küntay Award at the İsmet Küntay Theatre Awards ceremony.

Theater 
 Kalpak : Vera Kissel – Istanbul State Theater – 2013
 Antigone : Sophocles – Istanbul State Theater – 2011
 King Kong's Daughters : Theresia Walser – Istanbul State Theater – 2010
 Arıza : Emre Koyuncuoğlu – İKSV – 2006
 Yaban : Yakup Kadri Karaosmanoğlu – Istanbul State Theater – 2004
 Kırmızı Yorgunları : Özen Yula – İzmit City Theater – 2003
 Blood Wedding : Federico García Lorca – Istanbul State Theater – 2000
 Gel Evlenelim Yürü Boşanalım Necati Cumalı – Istanbul State Theater – 1999
 Atçalı Kel Memet : Orhan Asena – Istanbul State Theater – 1998
 Tartuffe  : Molière – Diyarbakır State Theater – 1997
 Blood Wedding : Federico García Lorca – Diyarbakır State Theater – 1996
 Sevgili Yalan : Jurgen Cross : Diyarbakır State Theater – 1994
 Budala : Fyodor Dostoevsky\Simon Gray – Istanbul State Theater – 1990

Filmography

References

External links 
 
 Öğretmenleri kutlarım – Interview with Hürriyet Newspaper, 27 November 1999.

1939 births
Best Supporting Actress Golden Orange Award winners
Turkish stage actresses
Turkish film actresses
Turkish television actresses
Living people
Actresses from Istanbul